The Clemson Tigers men's basketball teams of 1950–1959 represented Clemson Agricultural College in NCAA college basketball competition.

1949–50

1950–51

1951–52

1952–53

1953–54

The Tigers began play in the Atlantic Coast Conference.

1954–55

1955–56

1956–57

1957–58

1958–59

References

Games: 
Coaches: 

1950